Yì is a Chinese surname, in Cantonese it is transliterated as Yick or Yik, the Chinese commercial code (CCC) of which is 2496. It is also rarely  spelled as Yih or Ie, depending on where it is originated.

Yi (이), is a phonetic pronunciation of a Korean surname that has a different origin than the Chinese surname (易). The origin of Yi (Korean surname) can be traced back to the writings of Sima Qian and Three Kingdoms of Korea and uses the Chinese characters 李, 異, or 伊. They are often romanized as Li (surname) or Lee (Korean surname), or Itō (surname) in Japanese.

Place of origin
According to the book of Hundred Family Surnames (百家姓), Yi family originated from Jiang (姜) family who moved to Yi county (present day Chang county in Hebei province). The other place of origin is Yi county (present day Yi county in Hebei province). During the period of Qin dynasty, Yi family were mainly situated at Shandong and Henan. At the end of Eastern Han dynasty until the beginning of Southern and Northern Dynasties period, they started to scatter across the central plains, and moving toward present day Hunan province.

Nowadays, Yi surname ranks 106th among other family surnames in mainland China with members up to more than 1.7 million, making 0.12% of total Chinese population. A 2013 study found that it was the 114th most-common name, shared by 1.75 million people, or 0.130% of the population, with the largest province being Hunan.

Notable people (易)
Yi Yuanji (易元吉, c.a. 1000–1064), styled Qingzhi (庆之), Northern Song Dynasty painter, famous for his realistic paintings of animals.
Yi Zhongtian (易中天, born 1947), Chinese historian, author, scholar and TV personality.
Yi Jianlian (易建联, born 1987), Chinese professional basketball player for the Guangdong Southern Tigers of the CBA.
Jackson Yee (易烊千璽, born 2000), Chinese singer, dancer and actor.

Fictional people
Master Yi, the Wuji Bladesman, a playable champion character in the multiplayer online battle arena video game League of Legends
Yi, a Chinese Wild Kratts Girl, from the TV show Wild Kratts

References

Chinese-language surnames
Individual Chinese surnames